BorderIrish or @BorderIrish was the pseudonym of an anonymous satirical author, resident on the island of Ireland, who from 2018 to 2020 wrote in the first person about being the 97-year-old  Irish border between the Republic of Ireland and Northern Ireland (i.e. an anthropomorphism), both on Twitter as @BorderIrish and in print with I Am the Border, So I Am (2019); and in particular on the implications of Brexit on the Irish land border.

Authorship

The author first began posting satirical tweets as the Irish border in February 2018, tweeting "I'm seamless and frictionless already, thanks. Bit scared of physical infrastructure. Don't like the sea". In a December 2018 interview with Austrian newspaper Wiener Zeitung, BorderIrish said (as the border): "I had retired and spent the past 20 years watching the sheep and the clouds. Everyone had forgotten me, but then Brexit came and suddenly journalists were looking for me and politicians were talking nonsense about me, so I decided to make me heard".

In a December 2018 interview with BBC News (both as the author, and as the border), the author identified as male, and said he had lived on both sides of the border; however, he has not clarified any other facts regarding his identity, and speaks through his agents.

The author has been interviewed as his pseudonym, both by Irish and British media and by media from the European continent; and his satirical tweets as the Irish border have been discussed in wider media coverage on Brexit.

In January 2019, the Twitter account of Irish taoiseach Leo Varadkar was noted as a follower of @BorderIrish; other notable followers of @BorderIrish include Robert Peston and Alastair Campbell.

On 31 January 2020, as the United Kingdom left the European Union, BorderIrish announced that he was retiring his Twitter account telling The Irish Times: "It feels like I won the battle and lost the war"; and signing off his Twitter account with "I was the Border, so I was".

Works

In October 2019, BorderIrish released a book titled I Am the Border, So I Am,  which was favourably reviewed, and described by Fintan O'Toole as "among the best satires of the Brexit era", and listed by Alex Clark in the Financial Times  "Best audiobooks of 2019".

Bibliography

See also
Brexit and the Irish border
Brexit in popular culture
Twitterature
Led By Donkeys

References

External links

@BorderIrish: 22 Unmissable Tweets, from British satirical website, The Poke (June 2018)

Irish satirists
Irish bloggers
Irish political writers
Republic of Ireland–United Kingdom border
Consequences of Brexit
Irish humorists
Male bloggers
Irish male writers
Parody social media accounts
Fictional characters introduced in 2018
Absurdist fiction
Twitter accounts
21st-century pseudonymous writers